Zlatoustovka is a rural locality (a village) in Bala-Chetyrmansky Selsoviet, Fyodorovsky District, Bashkortostan, Russia. The population was 279 as of 2010. There are 3 streets.

Geography 
Zlatoustovka is located 33 km east of Fyodorovka (the district's administrative centre) by road. Fedotovka is the nearest rural locality.

References 

Rural localities in Fyodorovsky District